Crane is a census-designated place and unincorporated community in Harney County, Oregon, United States, northeast of Malheur Lake on Oregon Route 78. Its population was 116 at the 2020 census.

History
Crane was named for the prominent local features Crane Creek and Crane Creek Gap. Crane Creek Gap is the pass between the Harney Basin and the drainage basin of the South Fork Malheur River. Crane Creek is probably named for the sandhill crane, which was once abundant in eastern Oregon. Crane post office was established in 1895 and discontinued in 1903. When the Union Pacific Railroad was completed from Ontario, Oregon, in 1916, the post office was reopened.

Until the railroad was finished to Burns in 1924, Crane was an important livestock shipping point, and the town was thriving with its five restaurants, four hotels, three garages, two general merchandise stores, a warehouse, a lumber yard, livery stables, a dance hall, a newspaper, a bank and a movie theater. After a series of fires, the latest in 1938, however, the town never returned to its former prosperity. As of 2011, the businesses in Crane included a post office, a gas station, which is combined with a café and tavern, a farm supply store, and a local realtor.

Geography
Crane is in eastern Harney County along Oregon Route 78 (Steens Highway), which leads northwest  to Burns, the county seat, and southeast  to U.S. Route 95 at Burns Junction.

Demographics

Education

Crane Union High School and Crane Elementary School are in Crane. The high school, which draws students from a large rural district, is a boarding school.

Harney County is not in a community college district but has a "contract out of district" (COD) with Treasure Valley Community College. TVCC operates the Burns Outreach Center in Burns.

Climate
According to the Köppen Climate Classification system, Crane has a semi-arid climate, abbreviated "BSk" on climate maps.

References

External links

Historic photo of Crane railroad depot from Salem Public Library

Unincorporated communities in Harney County, Oregon
Census-designated places in Oregon
1895 establishments in Oregon
Populated places established in 1895
Census-designated places in Harney County, Oregon
Unincorporated communities in Oregon